This is a list of Maldivian films released during 2015.

Releases

Feature film

Television
This is a list of Maldivian series, in which the first episode was aired or streamed in 2015.

References

External links

Maldivian
2015